A brine pipeline is a pipeline to transport brine. It is a common way to transport salt from salt mines, salt wells and sink works to the places of salt evaporation (salterns, salt pans). Brine pipelines are also used in the oil and gas industries, and to remove salts and contaminants from water supplies.

Salt mining
Brine pipelines were originally made of hollowed wood. One of the earliest known wooden pipelines ran from Bad Reichenhall to Traunstein to Rosenheim, Germany, in 1619.

An ancient brine pipeline may be traced along the Sentier du Sel, a 12.5 km trail in Chablais vaudois, Switzerland.

References

Salt production